Coccinula is a genus of ladybird beetles. It contains the following species:

Coccinula crotchi
Coccinula elegantula
Coccinula oresitropha
Coccinula principalis
Coccinula redimita
Coccinula quatuordecimguttata
Coccinula quatuordecimpunctata
Coccinula quatuordecimpustulata
Coccinula sinensis
Coccinula sinuatomarginata

References 

Coccinellidae genera
Taxa named by Theodosius Dobzhansky